Events during the year 1995 in Italy.

Incumbents
President: Oscar Luigi Scalfaro 
Prime Minister: 
Silvio Berlusconi (until 17 January) 
Lamberto Dini (from 17 January)

Events  
11 June – 1995 Italian referendum
13 December – Banat Air Flight 166 accident

Births  

16 March – Daniele Cardelli, footballer
16 March – Daniele Cardelli, footballer
18 March – Pierluigi Gollini, footballer
23 March – Alberto Boniotti, footballer
24 March – Luca Lezzerini, footballer
12 April – Lorenzo Venuti, footballer
26 April – Lorenzo Fragola, singer-songwriter
18 May – Marco Lazzaroni, rugby union player
30 June – Andrea Petagna, footballer
1 July – Federico Palmieri, footballer 
14 July – Riccardo Ferrara, footballer
5 August – Stefano Sensi, footballer
30 August – David Zimmerhofer, footballer
23 September – Francesco Mileto, footballer
13 October – Leonardo Morosini, footballer
30 October – Leonardo Morosini, footballer
16 November – Nicola Sambo, footballer

Deaths  

6 February – Edy Campagnoli, television personality and actress (b. 1934)
13 February – Alberto Burri, artist (b. 1915)
19 March – Giuseppe Nirta, mafia boss (b. 1913)
27 March – Maurizio Gucci, businessman and murder victim (b. 1948)
22 April – Carlo Ceresoli, footballer (b. 1910)
25 April – Andrea Fortunato, footballer (b. 1971)
27 April – Maurizio Gucci, businessman (b. 1948)
12 May – Mia Martini, singer and songwriter (b. 1947)
12 June – Arturo Benedetti Michelangeli, pianist (b. 1920)
18 July – Fabio Casartelli, cyclist (b. 1970)
20 August – Hugo Pratt, comics creator (b. 1927)
2 October – Alessandro Rampini, footballer (b. 1896)

References 

 
1990s in Italy
Years of the 21st century in Italy
Italy
Italy